The Hama Sanjak was a prefecture (sanjak) of the Ottoman Empire, located in modern-day Syria. The city of Hama was the Sanjak's capital. It had a population of 200,410 in 1914. The Sanjak of Hama shared same region with Sanjak of Homs and Sanjak of Salamiyah.

References

Hama
States and territories established in 1549
Sanjaks of Ottoman Syria
1549 establishments in the Ottoman Empire
1918 disestablishments in the Ottoman Empire